Arzonella is a monotypic genus of wasps belonging to the family Encyrtidae. The only species is Arzonella curiosa.

References

Encyrtidae
Monotypic Hymenoptera genera